The following is a list of notable people who were born in the U.S. state of Vermont, live or lived in Vermont, or for whom Vermont is a significant part of their identity and who have entries in Wikipedia:

A
 Bert Abbey (1869–1962), Major League baseball pitcher; born in Essex
 Charles Francis Adams (1876–1947), first owner of the Boston Bruins (1924–1925), born in Newport
 Charles Kendall Adams (1835–1902), educator and historian; born in Derby
 Frederick W. Adams (1786–1858), physician, author, violin maker; born in Pawlet
 Sherman Adams (1899–1986), politician, Chief of Staff for President Dwight D. Eisenhower; born in East Dover
 Eric Aho, painter
 Charles Augustus Aiken (1827–1892), clergyman and academic; born in Manchester
 George Aiken (1892–1984), Governor and US Senator; from Putney
 Ivan Albright (1897–1983), painter and artist; lived in Woodstock
 Henry Mills Alden, editor of Harper's Weekly; born in Mount Tabor
 Ebenezer Allen, 18th-century soldier
 Ethan Allen, commander of the Green Mountain Boys
 Fanny Allen, nun, daughter of Ethan Allen; namesake of the Fanny Allen Hospital in Colchester
 Ira Allen, one of Vermont's founders; brother of Ethan Allen
 Jerome Allen, author; born in Westminster
 Julia Alvarez, author; writer-in-residence at Middlebury College
 Trey Anastasio, vocalist and guitarist for Phish; attended University of Vermont

 Piers Anthony (pseudonym), science-fiction author
 Harriett Ellen Grannis Arey, author, editor, and publisher; born in Cavendish, Vermont
 Lemuel H. Arnold, Governor of Rhode Island (1831–1833); born in St. Johnsbury
 Chester A. Arthur, 21st President of the United States; born in Fairfield
 Warren Austin, early U.S. Ambassador to the United Nations; born in Highgate
 Charlotte Ayanna, actress, 1993 Miss Teen USA
 Mary Azarian, woodcut artist, children's book illustrator; resides in Plainfield

B
 Orville E. Babcock, American Civil War general
 Edwin Eugene Bagley, composer of "National Emblem" and other marches
 Maxine Bahns, actress, born in Stowe
 Arthur Scott Bailey, author of children's books, born in St. Albans
 Emma Bailey, first American woman auctioneer, lived in Brattleboro
 Brad Baker, baseball pitcher, born in Brattleboro
 David Ball, NFL football player
 Ella Maria Ballou (1852-1937), writer; born in Wallingford, Vermont
 Hosea Ballou, a father of American Universalism
 Bradley Barlow, politician; born in Fairfield
 John Barrett, diplomat; born in Grafton
 John S. Barry, 5th and 8th governor of Michigan
 John L. Barstow, 39th Governor of Vermont
 Daric Barton, baseball player; born in Springfield
 Lindon Wallace Bates, civil engineer; born in Marshfield
 Portus Baxter, politician
 Fernando C. Beaman, politician
 Orson Bean, actor, born in Burlington
 Alison Bechdel, cartoonist
 Johnny Behan, 19th-century sheriff of Tombstone, Arizona
 Hiram Bell, politician, born in Salem
 H. H. Bennett, photographer; raised in Brattleboro
 Wilson "Snowflake" Bentley, scientist and photographer
 Bill W., founder of Alcoholics Anonymous; born in East Dorset 
 Charles E. Billings, inventor; born in Weathersfield
 Franklin S. Billings, 60th Governor of Vermont
 Frederick H. Billings, lawyer, financier and President of the Northern Pacific Railway
 Henrietta A. Bingham 19th-century writer, editor, and preceptress; born in Burke
 Stephen Bissette, comic book artist
 Pamela Blair, actress; born in Bennington
 George Bliss, politician; born in Jericho
 Lou Blonger, saloon owner, con man
 Aretas Blood, locomotive manufacturer; born in Weathersfield
 Asa P. Blunt, American Civil War general
 Tom Bodett, spokesman for Motel 6
 Chris Bohjalian, author
 Andrew Bowen, actor
 Elmer Bowman, baseball player; born in Proctor
 Keegan Bradley, golfer, 2011 PGA Champion; grew up in Woodstock
 Ezra Brainerd, college president; born in St. Albans
 L. Paul Bremer, with Coalition Provisional Authority, Iraq (2003–2004)
 Richard M. Brewer (1852–1878), cowboy; born in St. Albans
 Francis Fisher Browne, editor, poet
 Orestes Brownson, activist
 Pearl S. Buck, author, died in Danby
 T. Garry Buckley, former lieutenant governor
 Ted Bundy (1946–1989), serial killer; born in Burlington
 James E. Burke, former chief executive officer of Johnson & Johnson
 Alex Burnham, of The Burnham Brothers Band
 Andre Burnham, of The Burnham Brothers Band
 Forrest Burnham, of The Burnham Brothers Band
 Steven T. Byington, anarchist

C
 John C. Caldwell, American Civil War general
 John H. Caldwell, cross-country ski coach and author
 Thomas Cale, teacher and politician
 Delino Dexter Calvin, Canadian politician
 Jim Cantore, Weather Channel meteorologist
 Jake Burton Carpenter, owner of Burton Snowboards; from Londonderry
 Matthew H. Carpenter, Wisconsin politician
 Albert Carrington, clergyman
 Hayden Carruth, poet and critic
 Neko Case, singer
 William B. Castle, former mayor of Cleveland
 Lucien B. Caswell, politician
 Suzy Chaffee, skier, "Suzy Chapstick"
 Beth Chamberlin, fitness coach
 John Putnam Chapin, 19th-century mayor of Chicago
 Welcome Chapman, Mormon leader
 Harrie B. Chase, judge
 Horace Chase, former mayor of Milwaukee
 Daniel Chipman, politician
 Nathaniel Chipman, U.S. senator from Vermont, federal judge for the district of Vermont, chief justice of the supreme court of Vermont, satirical poet
 Lucius E. Chittenden, politician in Abraham Lincoln administration
 Thomas Chittenden, first Governor of Vermont
 Bonnie Christensen, artist, author, and illustrator
 Stoyan Christowe, writer, publicist and journalist
 Sylvester Churchill, soldier and journalist
 Joseph A. Citro, author
 Charles Edgar Clark, admiral during the Spanish–American War
 Kelly Clark, Olympic gold medalist, snowboarding 2002
 William Bullock Clark, geologist

 Skiing Cochrans, ski racers
 Richard A. Cody, U.S. Army general
 William Sloane Coffin Jr., clergyman; resident of Strafford
 Ben Cohen, co-founder of Ben & Jerry's

 Zerah Colburn (1804–1840), math prodigy; born in Cabot
 Lui Collins, singer-songwriter
 Ray Collins, baseball player
 Gardner Quincy Colton, pioneer of the use of nitrous oxide (laughing gas) for dental procedures; from Georgia, Vermont
 George Colvocoresses, American Civil War naval officer
 George Partridge Colvocoresses, admiral
 Jessica Comolli, Miss Vermont USA 2007
 Thomas Jefferson Conant, Biblical scholar
 George A. Converse, admiral
 Calvin Coolidge, 30th President of the United States; born in Plymouth Notch
 Barry M. Costello, US Vice admiral; native of Rutland
 Douglas M. Costle, environmentalist
 Oliver Cowdery, religious leader
 Robert Cowdin, American Civil War colonel

 Aaron H. Cragin, US representative and senator
 Mary Lynde Craig (1834-1921), president, Pacific Coast Women's Press Association; born in Vermont
 Donald J. Cram, Nobel Prize-winning chemist
 Jay Craven, film director, professor

D
 Tim Daly, actor, producer, and director
 John Cotton Dana, museum director, librarian
 Jeff Danziger, political cartoonist
 Thomas Davenport, inventor of electric motor; born in Williamstown
 Howard Dean, Governor of Vermont (1991–2003), Democratic National Committee chairman (2005–2009)
 John Deere, inventor of steel plow, founder of agricultural equipment manufacturer Deere & Company; born in Rutland
 David Dellinger, one of Chicago Seven; died in Montpelier
 Davis Rich Dewey MIT professor
 George Dewey, hero of the 1898 Battle of Manila Bay; only Admiral of the Navy ever appointed in America
 Joel Dewey, Brigadier General, Union Army
 John Dewey, philosopher, psychologist, and educator, born in Burlington
 Michael Dante DiMartino, co-creator, executive producer, writer, and story editor of the animated TV series, Avatar: The Last Airbender and The Legend of Korra.
 Charles Doolittle, Brigadier general under Andrew Johnson
 Julia Caroline Dorr, author
 Stephen A. Douglas, U.S. Senator from Illinois; born in Brandon; nominated for president 1860
 A. E. Douglass, astronomer
 Norman Dubie, poet
 Jean Dubuc, baseball pitcher; born in St. Johnsbury
 William Wade Dudley, politician
 Chris Duffy, baseball player; born in Brattleboro
 Charles Durkee Governor of Utah Territory and US senator

E
 Horatio Earle, promoted "good roads" when the automobile was introduced
 Dorman Bridgman Eaton, instrumental in federal civil service reform
 John Eaton, US commissioner of education 
 Scot Eaton, comic book artist
 Eddy Brothers, psychics
 George F. Edmunds, senator; born in Richmond
 Merritt A. Edson, decorated U.S. Marine officer; born in Chester
 Chesselden Ellis, politician; born in Windsor
 George F. Emmons, admiral; born in Clarendon
 Roger Enos, general in the American revolution
 Jacob Estey, organ manufacturer
 Jeremiah Evarts, missionary and reformer; born in Sunderland

F
 Franklin Fairbanks, political figure, philanthropist, co-founder of Rollins College, president of Fairbanks Scales
 William Fairfield, Canada politician
 John C. Farrar, book publisher; born in Burlington
 Thomas Green Fessenden, early American writer
 Young Firpo, boxer
 Dorothy Canfield Fisher, writer; died in Arlington
 Robert M. Fisher, abstract artist
 Jon Fishman, drummer, vocalist from band Phish
 Carlton Fisk, Baseball Hall of Fame catcher; born in Bellows Falls
 James Fisk, financier
 Irving Fiske, playwright; lived in Rochester
 William Charles Fitzgerald, naval officer; born in Montpelier
 John Fitzpatrick, former mayor of New Orleans; born in Fairfield
 Ed Flanagan, auditor of accounts and state senator
 Helen Hartness Flanders, collector of traditional ballads
 Ralph Flanders, industrialist and senator
 Henry A. Fletcher, American Civil War soldier, politician

 George P. Foster, American Civil War general
 Hal Fowler, professional poker player
 Simon Fraser, fur trader, Canada explorer
 Martin Henry Freeman, college president
 Robert Frost, iconic poet; poet laureate of Vermont
 Ida May Fuller, first recipient of Social Security
 John Fusco, film producer, screenwriter of Hidalgo and Young Guns

G
 Phineas Gage, railroad man, medical test patient
 Barbara Galpin, journalist; born in Weathersfield, Vermont
 Larry Gardner, baseball player; born in Enosburgh
 Elmina M. Roys Gavitt, physician; born in Fletcher
 David Giancola, film director; born in Rutland
 Cynthia Gibb, actress; born in Bennington
 Amanda Gilman, Miss Vermont USA 2006
 Joseph A. Gilmore, Governor of New Hampshire (1863–1865)
 Louise Glück, Pulitzer Prize-winning poet
 Thyrza Nichols Goodeve, writer
 Isaac Goodnow, founder of Kansas State University and Manhattan, Kansas; born in Whitingham
 Mike Gordon, vocals, bassist from band Phish; attended UVM
 Walter W. Granger, paleontologist; born in Middletown Springs
 Lewis A. Grant, American Civil War soldier
 Duane Graveline, astronaut; born in Newport
 Milford Graves, drummer
 Peter Gray, psychologist
 Horace Greeley, editor, reformer, politician; apprenticed in East Poultney
 Hetty Green, financier from Bellows Falls
 Theodore P. Greene, admiral during American Civil War
 Wallace M. Greene, U.S. Marine general
 Jerry Greenfield, co-founder of Ben & Jerry's ice cream
 Josiah Grout, Canadian-born politician; 46th Governor of Vermont
 Efrain Guigui, orchestra conductor
 Luis Guzmán, actor; resides in Sutton

H
 Paul Hackett, football coach; born in Burlington
 William Haile, politician
 Joy Hakim, author; attended school in Rutland
 Enoch Hale, American Revolutionary War officer
 Hiland Hall, judge and governor of Vermont
 Lucy Mabel Hall-Brown, physician; born in Holland
 William Laurel Harris, muralist
 James Hartness, machine tool entrepreneur
 Bill Haugland, Canada television journalist
 William Babcock Hazen, American Civil War general
 Chris Hedges, journalist
 William W. Henry, American Civil War colonel
 Charles Shattuck Hill, educator
 John A. Hill, co-founder of McGraw-Hill
 Ethan A. Hitchcock, Major General during the American Civil War
 Edward Hoagland, essayist, taught at Bennington College; retired to Sutton
 Frederick Holbrook, former governor of Vermont
 Tristan Honsinger, jazz cellist; born in Burlington
 Samuel Hopkins, holder of first American patent, for pearl and potash process, 1790
 Charles Snead Houston, mountaineer, physician, scientist, and Peace Corps leader
 Charles Edward Hovey, educator, American Civil War general
 Jacob M. Howard, 19th-century politician
 James F. Howard Jr., professor of medicine
 Steven James Howard, politician
 William Alanson Howard, politician
 Felicity Huffman, actress; attended school in Putney
 Stephen Huneck, artist
 Richard Morris Hunt, architect
 William Morris Hunt, painter
 Stanley Edgar Hyman, literary critic; taught at Bennington

I
 James Monroe Ingalls, ballistics expert
 John Irving, author

J
 Horatio Nelson Jackson, auto pioneer; attended University of Vermont
 William Henry Jackson, painter; raised in Rutland
 Lindsey Jacobellis, snowboarder; from Stratton
 Jim Jeffords, politician; born in Rutland
 Milo Parker Jewett, educator
 Andrew Johnson, skier; born in Greensboro

 Ernie Johnson, baseball pitcher; born in Brattleboro
 Kenny Johnson, actor, The Shield
 Luke S. Johnson, religious leader
 Lyman E. Johnson, religious leader
George Jones, publisher and co-founder of The New York Times
 Miranda July, screenwriter and actress; born in Barre

K
 Bob Keeshan (1927–2004), television personality "Captain Kangaroo"; lived last 14 years of his life in Vermont
 A. Atwater Kent (1873–1949), inventor and radio maker; born in Burlington
 Henry W. Keyes, politician; born in Newbury
 Dan Kiley, landscape architect
 Christopher Kimball, host of PBS television's America's Test Kitchen
 Heber C. Kimball, religious leader
 Jamaica Kincaid, novelist
 King Tuff, musician
 Rudyard Kipling, British author; resident of Brattleboro when he wrote The Jungle Book 
 M. Jane Kitchel, politician; born in St. Johnsbury
 Bill Koch, skier, Olympic silver medalist; born in Brattleboro
 James Kochalka, comic book artist
 Ed Koren, illustrator and cartoonist for The New Yorker
 Madeleine M. Kunin, ambassador

L
 Walt Lanfranconi, baseball player; from Barre

 Shane Lavalette, photographer, publisher and editor of Lavalette; director of Light Work, a non-profit photography organization
 Patrick Leahy, U.S. Senator since 1975; born in Montpelier
 John LeClair, first native-born Vermonter to play in National Hockey League; born in St. Albans
 Bill "Spaceman" Lee, baseball pitcher
 Harry David Lee, developer of Lee Jeans; educated in Tunbridge
 Brady Leisenring, hockey player; from Stowe
 Henry M. Leland, developed Cadillac and Lincoln automobiles; born in Barton
 Melissa Leo, Academy Award-winning actress, resided in Putney
 Kevin Lepage, NASCAR driver; from Shelburne
 Joanna 'JoJo' Levesque (born 1990), singer, actress; born in Brattleboro
 Aaron Lewis, band member; from Rutland
 Barbour Lewis US Congressman
 Sinclair Lewis (1885–1951), Nobel Prize-winning author; lived in Barnard
 Sam Lloyd, actor (Scrubs); born in Weston
 Ki Longfellow, novelist
 Alfred Lebbeus Loomis, president, Association of American Physicians
 Gustavus Loomis, breveted Brigadier General
 Horatio G. Loomis, organizer of Chicago Board of Trade
 Phillips Lord, creator of radio programs; born in Hartford
 Will Lyman, actor; born in Burlington
 Lucius Lyon, helped charter State of Michigan; born in Shelburne

M
 Margaret MacArthur, musician, folk music archivist known as "Vermont's Songcatcher"

 Sean Patrick Maloney, Canadian-born U.S. Representative from New York since 2013
 David Mamet, playwright, screenwriter, film director; attended Goddard College
 Zosia Mamet, actress and musician
 Zophar M. Mansur Lieutenant governor
 William Marks, religious leader; born in Rutland
 Anna Marsh, philanthropist; created Brattleboro Retreat
 John Martin, businessman; born in Peacham
 Philip Maxwell, physician and politician; namesake of Chicago's Maxwell Street; born in Guilford
 Henry T. Mayo, four-star admiral; born in Burlington
 Archer Mayor, author; lives in Newfane
 John McCardell Jr., educator
 Page McConnell, keyboardist and vocalist for the band Phish
 Bill McKibben, environmentalist
 James Meacham, politician; born in Rutland
 William Rutherford Mead, architect; born in Brattleboro
 Andrea Mead Lawrence, first American to win two Olympic skiing gold medals; born in Rutland County
 Samuel Merrill, Indiana politician; born in Peacham
 Alexander Kennedy Miller, proponent of Autogyro
 Frank Miller, creator of comic books, graphic novels; raised in Montpelier
 Susan Tolman Mills, educator; born in Enosburgh
 Ross Miner (born 1991), skating coach and retired competitive figure skater
 Graham Mink, hockey player
 Anaïs Mitchell, singer; raised in Addison County
 Samuel Morey, inventor
 Justin Morgan, horse breeder; died in Randolph
 Justin Smith Morrill, sponsor of Land Grant College Act establishing "public ivies"
 George Sylvester Morris, educator
 Levi P. Morton, Vice President of United States and Governor of New York; born in Shoreham
 Howard Frank Mosher, author
 Joseph A. Mower, Civil War general; born in Woodstock
 Michael Moynihan, journalist
 Nico Muhly, classical music composer
 Dennis Murphy, musician

N
 Andrew Neel, filmmaker
 Harvey Newcomb, clergyman; born in Thetford
 Angie F. Newman, poet, writer, editor; born in Montpelier
 Clarina I. H. Nichols, reformer; born in Townshend
 David H. Nichols, Colorado sheriff, politician; born in Hardwick
 John Humphrey Noyes, socialist; born in Brattleboro

O
 Rachel Oakes Preston, religious leader, born in Vernon
 John O'Brien, filmmaker, born in Tunbridge
 Franklin W. Olin, manufacturer
 Buster Olney, sportswriter, sportscaster; born in Randolph Center
 Darcy Olsen, president of Goldwater Institute
 Ebenezer J. Ormsbee, politician
 Elisha Otis, founder of Otis Elevator Company; born in Halifax

P
 Emily Rebecca Page, poet and editor; born in Bradford
 Morgan Page, music producer
 Grace Paley, poet
 Jay Parini, writer
 Alden Partridge, educator, West Point superintendent
 Katherine Paterson, author of children's books
 Theodore S. Peck, Civil War Medal of Honor recipient
 Moses Pendleton, choreographer
 Joe Perry, lead guitarist for Aerosmith
 Tom Peters, business writer
 Belle L. Pettigrew, educator and missionary; born in Ludlow
 Charles E. Phelps, American Civil War colonel, politician
 John W. Phelps, American Civil War general, presidential candidate
 Hannah Maynard Pickard, teacher, writer; born in Chester
 William Lamb Picknell, 19th-century painter, member of National Academy of Design
 Samuel E. Pingree, American Civil War officer, politician
 Hester M. Poole, writer and social reformer; born in Whiting
 Russell W. Porter, explorer, artist
 Grace Potter, of rock band Grace Potter and the Nocturnals 
 Ross Powers, snowboarder, 2002 Olympics gold medalist
 Silas G. Pratt, composer
 Cyrus Pringle, botanist
 Annie Proulx, Pulitzer Prize-winning novelist; lived in Vermont for more than 30 years
 Harvey Putnam, New York politician

Q
 Randy Quaid, actor

R
 Thomas E. G. Ransom, American Civil War general, surveyor
 Edward Rawson, Atlanta businessman; born in Craftsbury
 Edmund Rice, politician; born in Waitsfield
 Henry Mower Rice, Minnesota politician; born in Waitsfield
 Linda Richards, America's first trained nurse; attended St. Johnsbury Academy
 Mark Richards, U.S. congressman; lived in Westminster
 Israel B. Richardson, American Civil War officer
 Benjamin S. Roberts, American Civil War officer
 Edward D. Robie, American Civil War officer
 Moses Robinson, governor of Vermont pre-statehood
 Theodore Robinson, painter
 Norman Rockwell, artist; lived in Arlington
 David McGregor Rogers, Canada politician; born in Londonderry
  Mark Ronchetti, Republican nominee for Governor of New Mexico (2022)
 Brian Rooney, convicted murderer
 Thomas Rowley, poet
 Homer Elihu Royce, politician, jurist; born in Berkshire
 Carl Ruggles, composer
 Rudolph Ruzicka, typeface designer and engraver

S
 Alvah Sabin, minister, politician; born in Georgia, Vermont
 William James Shaw, entrepreneur
 Truman Henry Safford, mathematics whiz; born in Royalton
 Matt Salinger, actor, son of J.D. Salinger; born in Windsor

 Bernie Sanders, politician, Vermont Senator since 2007, former Mayor of Burlington (1981–1989), Democratic presidential candidate (2016 and 2020)
 Philetus Sawyer, Wisconsin politician; born in Whiting
 Eric Schaeffer, screenwriter, director, actor
 Helen Bonchek Schneyer, folk musician; died in Vermont
 Stephen Alonzo Schoff, engraver; born in Danville
 Peter Schumann, founder and director of Bread and Puppet Theater
 Arthur E. Scott, photographer; born in Montpelier
 Julian Scott, 19th-century painter and muralist; born in Johnson
 Thomas O. Seaver, American Civil War officer
 Rudolf Serkin, classical pianist; lived in Guilford
 Truman Seymour, American Civil War officer
 Patrick Sharp, Canadian-born hockey player; attended University of Vermont
 L. M. Shaw, governor of Iowa, presidential candidate; born in Morristown
 Patty Sheehan, golfer, winner of 35 LPGA tournaments; born in Middlebury
 Charles H. Sheldon, 19th-century governor of South Dakota; born in Johnson
 George Dallas Sherman, military bandleader
 Alexander O. Smith, author, Japanese translator
 "Dr. Bob" Smith, co-founder of Alcoholics Anonymous
 Charles Plympton Smith, banker, politician
 David Smith, sculptor; died in South Shaftsbury
 Eva Munson Smith, composter, author, poet; born in Monkton
 Hyrum Smith, religious leader
 J. Gregory Smith, railroad executive, politician
 John Butler Smith, manufacturer, politician
 Joseph Smith, Sr., father of Joseph Smith
 Joseph Smith (1805–1844), founder of Latter Day Saint movement; born in Sharon
 Samuel Harrison Smith, of Latter Day Saints
 William Smith, of Latter Day Saints
 William Farrar Smith, American Civil War officer
 Aleksandr Solzhenitsyn, Russian author, historian; recipient, 1970 Nobel Prize for Literature; lived in Vermont to avoid persecution in Russia; returned to Russia after Perestroika
 Ignat Solzhenitsyn, conductor and pianist
 Ronald I. Spiers, diplomat, ambassador
 Ken Squier, NASCAR commentator and announcer, founder and owner of Thunder Road International Speedbowl in Barre and co-founder of American Canadian Tour racing series; lives in Stowe
 Michael A. Stackpole, science fiction and fantasy author
 Henry Alexander Stafford, baseball player for the New York Giants
 Robert Stafford, namesake of the Stafford Loan
 George J. Stannard, American Civil War general 
 Timothy Steele, poet
 Ralph Steiner, photographer, filmmaker
 Rockwell Stephens, writer, ski instructor
 Nettie Stevens, geneticist
 Thaddeus Stevens, 19th-century Pennsylvania politician
 Charles B. Stoughton, American Civil War officer
 Edwin H. Stoughton, American Civil War officer 
 F. Stewart Stranahan, American Civil War officer
 George Crockett Strong, American Civil War officer
 William Barstow Strong, railroad president
 Jake Sullivan, government official 
 Phil Scott, Vermont politician
 Willis Sweet, Idaho politician; born in Alburgh

T
 Horace Austin Warner Tabor, prospector, one of the "Silver Kings"
 Elisabeth von Trapp, folk singer, guitarist artist and musician
 Alphonso Taft, politician, Attorney General, Secretary of War under Ulysses S. Grant; born in Townshend
 Louise Taylor, singer-songwriter; born in Brattleboro
 Birdie Tebbetts, baseball player and manager; born in Burlington
 Hannah Teter, snowboarder, 2006 Olympic gold medalist; born in Belmont
 Elswyth Thane, romance novelist; lived in Wilmington
 Harry Bates Thayer, president and chairman of AT&T; educated in Northfield
 John Martin Thomas, university president, Middlebury College
 Stephen Thomas, American Civil War officer
 Tim Thomas, professional hockey player, played for UVM
 Dorothy Thompson, journalist and radio broadcaster
 Ernest Thompson, writer of On Golden Pond; born in Bellows Falls
 John Mellen Thurston, Nebraska senator; born in Montpelier
 George Tooker, painter; lives in Hartland
 Andrew Tracy, politician, born in Hartford
 Joseph Tracy, minister, historian
 Maria von Trapp, stepmother to Von Trapp family singers, The Sound of Music; died in Morrisville
 Tasha Tudor, author of children's books; died in Marlboro
 KT Tunstall, musician
 Fred Tuttle, senatorial candidate, star of film Man with a Plan
 Alexander Twilight, first African American to receive a college degree, and to be elected to public office in the United States
 Royall Tyler, one of the earliest American playwrights
 Dan Tyminski, sang vocals for George Clooney in film O Brother, Where Art Thou?

U
 Don A. J. Upham, Wisconsin politician; born in Weathersfield
 Samuel C. Upham, journalist, counterfeiter

V
 Rudy Vallée, singer and actor; born in Island Pond
 James Van Ness, 19th-century mayor of San Francisco; born in Burlington
 Stewart Van Vliet, American Civil War officer; born in Ferrisburg
 Rick Veitch, comic book artist; raised in Bellows Falls
 William Freeman Vilas, politician; born in Chelsea

W
 James M. Warner, American Civil War general
 Seth Warner, American Revolutionary War officer
 Cephas Washburn, missionary, educator
 Ebenezer Washburn, Canada politician
 Peter T. Washburn, early governor of Vermont
 Lucy H. Washington, poet, social reformer; born in Whiting
 Charles W. Waterman, Colorado senator
 Sterry R. Waterman, judge
Damon Wayans Jr., actor, born in Huntington
 Henry Wells, businessman, co-founded American Express and Wells Fargo
 Sterling Weed (1901–2005), bandleader
 Horatio Wells
 Brevet Major General William Wells, awarded Medal of Honor; born in Waterbury
 Andrew Wheating, middle-distance track athlete for the University of Oregon, 2008 Olympian
 William Almon Wheeler, Vice President of the United States, attended the University of Vermont for two years
 Dora V. Wheelock, activist, writer; born in Calais
 Hilton Wick, politician
 Jody Williams, recipient, 1997 Nobel Peace Prize for efforts to clear away and ban anti-personnel mines
 John Henry Williams, baseball player; son of Ted Williams
 Bill W. (Bill Wilson), co-founder of Alcoholics Anonymous
 James Wilson, globe maker
 Helen M. Winslow, journalist, editor, publisher; born in Westfield
 Steve Wisniewski, football player
 Brian Wood, illustrator
 George Woodard, dairy farmer, actor
 Urban A. Woodbury, former Vermont governor
 Edwin T. Woodward, American Civil War officer
 Dean Conant Worcester, zoologist, authority on the Philippines
 Samuel Worcester, missionary
 Jay Wright, poet
 Silas Wright, politician

Y
 Thomas Yamamoto, artist; lived and died in Plainfield
 Brigham Young (1801–1877), second prophet and president of the Church of Jesus Christ of Latter-day Saints; born in Whitingham

Z
 Barry Zorthian, chief spokesperson for U. S. government in Saigon, Vietnam (1964–1968); once worked in St. Johnsbury
 Daphne Zuniga, actress, raised in Reading

Gallery

See also

By educational institution affiliation

 List of Bennington College people

By governmental office

 List of governors of Vermont
 List of justices of the Vermont Supreme Court
 List of lieutenant governors of Vermont
 List of United States representatives from Vermont
 List of United States senators from Vermont

By location

 List of people from Bennington, Vermont
 List of people from Brattleboro, Vermont
 List of people from Burlington, Vermont
 List of people from Montpelier, Vermont
 List of people from Rutland (city), Vermont
 List of people from St. Albans (city), Vermont
 List of people from St. Johnsbury, Vermont

References

Lists of people from Vermont